Edgewood is a village in Effingham County, Illinois, United States. The population was 440 at the 2010 census, down from 527 at the 2000 census. Edgewood is part of the Effingham, IL Micropolitan Statistical Area.

History
Edgewood was founded in the 1850s when the railroad was extended to that point. The village was named from its location near the edge of a forest. A post office has been in operation at Edgewood since 1858.

Geography
Edgewood is located on the southern edge of Effingham County at  (38.923302, -88.662433). The village's southern border follows the Clay County line.

Illinois Route 37 passes through the village, leading northeast  to Mason and southwest  to Farina. Interstate 57 crosses the northwest corner of the village, with access from Exit 145 (Iowa Street); I-57 leads northeast  to Effingham and southwest  to Salem.

Demographics

As of the 2000 United States Census, there were 527 people, 226 households, and 148 families residing in the village. The racial makeup of the village was 99.81% White and 0.19% Native American. Hispanic or Latino of any race were 0.57% of the population.

There were 226 households, out of which 33.2% had children under the age of 18 living with them, 47.8% were married couples living together, 11.1% had a female householder with no husband present, and 34.5% were non-families. 29.6% of all households were made up of individuals, and 11.9% had someone living alone who was 65 years of age or older.  The average household size was 2.33 and the average family size was 2.86.

In the village, the population was spread out, with 26.0% under the age of 18, 9.5% from 18 to 24, 30.2% from 25 to 44, 21.4% from 45 to 64, and 12.9% who were 65 years of age or older.  The median age was 36 years. For every 100 females, there were 95.2 males.  For every 100 females age 18 and over, there were 92.1 males.

The median income for a household in the village was $20,987, and the median income for a family was $31,875. Males had a median income of $27,500 versus $21,083 for females. The per capita income for the village was $12,338.  About 16.1% of families and 16.7% of the population were below the poverty line, including 20.5% of those under age 18 and 12.5% of those age 65 or over.

Notable people

 Franklin P. Buyer, member of the Los Angeles City Council (1933–1939), born in Edgewood

References

Villages in Effingham County, Illinois
Villages in Illinois